Manuel Cavazos Lerma (born 12 March 1946 in Matamoros, Tamaulipas) is a Mexican politician and economist from the Institutional Revolutionary Party (PRI), who served as governor of Tamaulipas from 1993–1999.

Biography
Cavazos Lerma was born in Matamoros, Tamaulipas on 12 March 1946; son of Manuel Cavazos Rodríguez and Clara Lerma Sánchez. He studied Economics in the Monterrey Institute of Technology and Higher Education (1963–1968), where he has served as a professor.

Political career
He has been within the Institutional Revolutionary Party since 1972, where he formed part of the representative in the states of Tamaulipas and Durango for the PRI. He was president of the Nacional Committee League for Revolutionary Economists (1982–1984), and served as the delegate for the PRI party in the states of San Luis Potosí, Baja California, Coahuila, Jalisco and Yucatán.

Organized crime allegations
On 30 January 2012, the Attorney General of Mexico issued a communiqué ordering the past three governors of Tamaulipas—Manuel Cavazos Lerma, Eugenio Hernández Flores, and Tomás Yarrington—to remain in the country because they were being investigated for possible correlation with the Mexican drug cartels. The DEA has already accused Yarrington of laundering money for Los Zetas and the Gulf Cartel from 1999 to 2004, his time as governor.

The cousin of the ex-governor, Gilberto Lerma Plata, was arrested in the McAllen–Hidalgo–Reynosa International Bridge on 12 April 2012 by federal agents for alleged drug conspiracy. Lerma Plata was Mexican police commander in Tamaulipas who was reported in 2002 as a Gulf Cartel member who used his police ties to share information on authorities' movements to help the cartel.

References

1946 births
Living people
Governors of Tamaulipas
Politicians from Tamaulipas
People from Matamoros, Tamaulipas
Monterrey Institute of Technology and Higher Education alumni
Alumni of the London School of Economics
Academic staff of the Instituto Tecnológico Autónomo de México
20th-century Mexican politicians
21st-century Mexican politicians
Members of the Chamber of Deputies (Mexico)
Members of the Senate of the Republic (Mexico)
Senators of the LXII and LXIII Legislatures of Mexico